The Portuguese national ice hockey team is the national men's ice hockey team of Portugal. The team was previously controlled by the Federation of Portuguese Ice Sports (FPDG.) In September 2017, control was given to the Federação de Desportos de Inverno de Portugal, which also retains the associate membership within the International Ice Hockey Federation (IIHF), which had been acquired by the FPDG on May 13, 1999. Portugal is currently not ranked in the IIHF World Rankings and is still not actively competing in any World Championship events.

History

2000

Ice hockey was played in Portugal from 1996 until 2006 in the Palácio do Gelo shopping center, in Viseu. Since 2010, ice hockey practices and friendly games have been played in Elvas, Portugal.

In 2000, the national team of Portugal played three games, the only games they ever played. The team they compiled to play was made up of former Portuguese immigrants who played ice hockey in the United States and Canada, as well as former players from traditional roller hockey. The event consisted of three games between the newly created national team of Portugal and the First Portuguese Canadian Cultural Center (FPCCC) from Toronto, Ontario, representing Canada. The games were held from June 21 to June 23, 2000 at the Palácio do Gelo in Viseu.

The tournament was a game venture by the Federação Portuguesa de Desportos No Gelo and the Embassy of Canada, namely the Ambassador of Canada, Robert Vanderloo. The event was also sponsored by Banco Comercial Português and Nortel.

The FPCCC won the first game 18–6 and the second 21–5. Pedro Regado was the first ever player to score for Portugal when he scored on 8:04 mark of the first period. The third and final game was played with the decision to mix-up the teams, placing Portuguese descendants of the FPCCC on the Portuguese team. At the end of the third match, the score was a close 15–11 for FPCCC. Portugal has not played an organized match until 2015.

2015 onwards

In January 2015, Portugal returned to play two international exhibition games, against the Čeští lvi in Elvas, Portugal. Portugal won their first game ever with a 6-4 win and a 6-2 win on the day after. This exhibition games were sponsored by the Czech Republic embassy in Portugal, namely by the strong support of Czech ambassador Stanislav Kázecký.

On January 14, 2016. Portugal played two exhibition games in Prague, Czech Republic. Portugal lost 0-2 against the Čeští Lvi and 0-3 against the Sklepovští Sršáni. Two days afterwards Portugal won their first ever away game with a 4-3 victory against the Čeští Lvi.

On 14 and 15 January 2017, Portugal hosted a quadrangular tournament in Elvas, Portugal. This was the largest ice hockey competition ever held in the country. Other than team Portugal, there were invited two teams from Czech Republic, the Čeští Lvi, the Sklepovští Sršáni and the second division French team Evry-Viry Jets. Even if Portugal was not able to conquer the tournament, this event was another step forward for the Portuguese ice hockey community and showed their capacity of organizing an international event.

Portugal played on 22 and 23 April 2017 at an international tournament with teams from Norway, Finland and Spain at Granada, Spain. The national team now lead by their Canadian Coach Jim Aldred was able to retain a 6-0 victory against the Granada Eagles. It was the first away tournament played by Portugal and it showed a clear improvement in their level of play.

History was made once again on September 29, 2017 when Portugal won their first official game against another ice hockey national team. In Canillo, Andorra, Portugal won, 2-3 in a shootout, against the hosting state. After this historical moment, Portugal also played Ireland and Morocco, recording losses, nevertheless, in the silver medal game, Portugal won again against Andorra, by the score of 5-3. At this date, the Portuguese national team clearly showed that they would be able to compete against other national teams and also deliver a consistent game.

On March 17 and 18, 2018, Portugal played at the Gladiators international tournament were they won a silver medal, with a 4 win and 3 draw record. The team performed with 27 goals for and only 7 against. This tournament brought also several new Portuguese players playing in France, Switzerland and Canada, which assisted the team to greatly perform against other competitive teams.

On April 28 and 29, 2018, Portugal played returned to Granada to play the Mr. Taxi Cup. The team performed, once again, at a very competitive level, with very close scores with more experience teams.

Portugal then participated in the IIHF 2018 Development Cup which was held in Füssen, Germany along with Andorra, Ireland] and Macedonia. On November 19th Portugal faced Andorra and won  the final score of 11-2. At 20:00 they played against Ireland] and grabbed another victory with the scoreboard reflecting 12-4. On November 20th Portugal faced Macedonia where they fell short by 1 goal with Macedonia taking the victory with 5-4. At 18:00 Portugal played against Ireland] once more to determine which would be playing for Gold.  Winning 11-1 Portugals next game was at 19:00 against Macedonia where they fell short with the final score of 9-3 where Portugal obtained the Silver Medal.

Current roster

Results

Tournaments results

2017, Canillo, Andorra : Bronze
 2018, Füssen, Germany : Argent

All-time Record Against Other Nations
As of 11 November 2018

Press Articles

Diário de Notícias: Falta um terreno para a semente do hóquei no gelo português florescer
Sapo 24:Jogar hóquei no gelo... na praça de touros de Elvas
Sapo 24:Hóquei no Gelo: Portugal conquista a primeira vitória internacional
Sapo Desporto:Portugal Venceu República Checa em Gelo Alentejano
Sapo 24:Jogar hóquei no gelo... na praça de touros de Elvas
Correio da Manhã Jornal:Federação de Desportos no Gelo quer pista em Lisboa
Público:Uma nova selecção nacional
Diário de Notícias:Primeiras vitórias internacionais podem impulsionar hóquei no gelo em Portugal
IIHF:Portugal goes on ice: Interview With Maurício Xavier and Ivan Silva
National Teams of Ice Hockey: Portugal Wins First Ever Ice Hockey Game
The Hockey Writers: 2017 Development Cup Sees Two National Teams Debut
National Teams of Ice Hockey: Interview and Q & A With Luis de Almeida Johansson
TSF: Primeiras vitórias internacionais podem impulsionar hóquei no gelo em Portugal
National Euro Hockey: The new pioneers- Interview With Luis de Almeida Johansson
Embaixada Checa em Lisboa: O hóquei no gelo português estreou-se em Praga
Lidovsky: Záruba proháněl po ledě mladé hokejisty. Herec Vávra slavil triumf díky rumu
Lidovsky: Portugalští hokejisté vzkazují Ronaldovi a spol: Fotbal je hra pro ‚buzeranty'
Sapo Desporto: Curling, Luge e Hóquei no Gelo vão integrar Federação de Desportos de Inverno
Elvas News: Coliseu Acolheu Torneio Internacional de Hóquei no Gelo
Sic Notícias: Grupo de adeptos de hóquei no gelo usou pista de Natal em Elvas para jogar
Portal Alentejano: Elvas: Equipas amadoras de hóquei no gelo
Hockey Archives: Interview with Ronald Calhau, 03/12/2001
Sapo Desporto: Portugal Conquista o Segundo Lugar em Torneio Internacional na Holanda
Jornal de Notícias: A Falta que faz uma Pista de Gelo das Cidades
Sapo Desporto: O Inverno Chegou Só Falta o Milagre do Gelo
Sapo 24: Sonham com Uma Pista de Gelo e Gostavam que Sporting ou Benfica Seguissem o Exemplo

References

External links
www.iihf.com
Hockey Hall of Fame
Federação de Desportos de Inverno de Portugal
International Ice Hockey Federation - Portugal
National Teams of Ice Hockey - Portugal
EuroHockey - Portugal

National ice hockey teams in Europe
Ice hockey